Benzion Judah ben Eliahu Berkowitz (23 July 1803 – 11 May 1879) was Russian Hebrew scholar, who published a number of works devoted to the study of the Targum Onkelos. His contributions to the area were acknowledged by such scholars as Berliner and other specialists on the Targum. He also contributed to the Hebrew periodicals Pirḥe Tzafon, Ha-Karmel, Otzar Ḥokhmah, and Ha-Maggid.

Publications
 
 
 
  Addenda to Nathan Adler's Netinah la-ger.

References
 

1803 births
1879 deaths
19th-century Lithuanian Jews
19th-century male writers
Hebrew-language writers
People from Vilna Governorate
People of the Haskalah
Writers from Vilnius